The Strand Theatre fire occurred in Brockton, Massachusetts on March 10, 1941. 13 firefighters were killed when the roof collapsed, making it the deadliest firefighter disaster in Massachusetts.

Fire
Around 11:45 pm on March 9, 1941, theater manager Frank Clements locked up the building. Around 12:45 am, members of the Shoe City Club noticed smoke coming from the building and notified its caretaker, Horace Spencer. Spencer sounded the first alarm at 12:45 am and the second was sounded five minutes later. The fire started in the basement, but around 1:20 am it spread into the balcony, which led Chief Frank F. Dickinson to order a general alarm. According to investigators, the heat of the fire distorted steel trusses above the ceiling, which pushed the brick walls of the theater back and caused the roof to collapse. The collapse occurred around 1:50 am while four crews were inside fighting the fire. 12 firefighters were killed in the collapse and a thirteenth died in the Brockton Hospital two days later. The cause of the fire was never determined. A small anthracite coal memorial built by a firefighter from Scranton, Pennsylvania was placed in Brockton City Hall. In 2008 a 10-foot bronze statue of a firefighter kneeling in grief with the names of the 13 men killed in the fire engraved on a base was placed in City Hall Plaza.

References

1941 fires in the United States
1941 in Massachusetts
1941 disasters in the United States
Brockton, Massachusetts
Fires in Massachusetts
March 1941 events
Theatre fires